Mont-Louis (or el Vilar d'Ovansa) is a commune in the Pyrénées-Orientales department in southern France.

Geography 
Mont-Louis is located in the canton of Les Pyrénées catalanes and in the arrondissement of Prades. Mont-Louis-La Cabanasse station has rail connections to Villefranche-de-Conflent and Latour-de-Carol.

Government and politics

Mayors

Population

Sites of interest 

In 2008, the citadel and the city walls of Mont-Louis were listed as part of the Fortifications of Vauban UNESCO World Heritage Site, because of its outstanding engineering and testimony to the development of military architecture in the 17th through 19th centuries.

The Mont-Louis Solar Furnace, is the world's first solar furnace, built in 1949, by engineer Félix Trombe. It is open to visit for practical education on solar energy uses and technologies.

The citadel has been hosting for more than half a century the National Commando Training Center (French Army) which trains elite French troops and some foreign ones in the usage of commando techniques and for enduring heavy physical and mental stress in combat situations. Nevertheless, some places of the citadel, like the "Puits de Forçats", can also be visited, being accompanied by a local guide.

Notable people 

 Sébastien Le Prestre de Vauban (1633-1707), military engineer who conceived and directed the construction of Mont-Louis.
 Pedro Étienne Solère (1753–1817), classical clarinetist
 Jean Gilles (1904-1961), French Army general who died in Mont-Louis.

See also
Communes of the Pyrénées-Orientales department
 Mont-Louis Solar Furnace
 Ligne de Cerdagne

References

External links
 Webpage about the fortifications of Mont-Louis

Communes of Pyrénées-Orientales
Vauban fortifications in France